Raghvendra Singh Chauhan (born on ) is an Indian judge. He is former Chief Justice of Uttarakhand High Court and Telangana High Court. He has also served as Acting Chief Justice of Telangana High Court and Judge of Telangana High Court, Karnataka High Court and Rajasthan High Court.

Career 
Justice R. S. Chauhan is B.A., L.L.B. He was born on 24 December 1959. He started his career as an Advocate on 13 November 1983 in the Rajasthan High Court. His field of specialization is in criminal and service matters. 

He was appointed an Additional Judge of the Rajasthan High Court on 13 June 2005. He was promoted as Permanent Judge on 24 January 2008. Then he was transferred as a Judge of Karnataka High Court on 10 March 2015. Again he was transferred as judge of Telangana High Court on 8 November 2018.

He was appointed Acting Chief Justice of the Telangana High Court on 3 April 2019. On 22 June 2019, he was appointed Chief Justice of Telangana High Court.

He was appointed Chief Justice of Uttarakhand High Court on 31st December 2020 and took oath on 7th January 2021.

References 

 

1959 births
Living people
Chief Justices of the Telangana High Court
Judges of the Karnataka High Court
Judges of the Rajasthan High Court